Mongolia first competed at the Asian Games in 1974, and has participated
ten times in the Asian Games until 2014.

Medals by Asian Games

Medals by sport

Medals by Asian Winter Games

East Asian Games

Medals by sport

Beach Games

Indoor and Martial Arts Games

Medals by sport

Martial Arts Games

Medals by sport

Youth Games

Medals by sport

Multiple Asian Games medalists

See also
Mongolia at the Olympics
List of Mongolians

References

 
Sport in Mongolia